is a passenger railway station  located in the city of Odawara, Kanagawa Prefecture, Japan, operated by the  East Japan Railway Company (JR East).

Lines
Nebukawa Station is served by the Tōkaidō Main Line, and is located 90.4 kilometers from the line’s terminus at Tokyo Station.

Station layout
The station consists of two island platform serving four tracks. The two platforms are connected to the station building by a footbridge. Track one is not in use, while track three is used for local trains to stop while rapid trains pass. The station is unattended.

Platforms

Station history
Nebukawa Station first opened on December 21, 1922, when the section of the Atami-Odawara Line connecting Odawara with Manazuru was completed. On September 1, 1923, Nebukawa Station accident occurred due to the Great Kanto earthquake.

From December 1, 1934 the Odawara-Atami Line became part of the re-routed Tōkaidō Main Line following the opening of the Tanna Tunnel. Regularly scheduled freight services were discontinued in 1970, and small parcel services by 1972. With the dissolution and privatization of the JNR on April 1, 1987, the station came under the control of the East Japan Railway Company. Automated turnstiles using the Suica IC Card system came into operation from November 18, 2001. The “Midori no Madoguchi” service counter was discontinued from 2002.

Passenger statistics
In fiscal 2008, the station was used by an average of 639 passengers daily.

Surrounding area
 Nebugawa Onsen
Enoura Observatory 
Shiraito River
Enoura beach
Odawara Municipal Kataura Elementary School

See also
List of railway stations in Japan
Nebukawa Station accident (1923)

References

Yoshikawa, Fumio. Tokaido-sen 130-nen no ayumi. Grand-Prix Publishing (2002) .
 Hammer, Joshua. (2006).  Yokohama Burning: The Deadly 1923 Earthquake and Fire that Helped Forge the Path to World War II. New York: Simon & Schuster.   (cloth)

External links

Official home page.

Railway stations in Kanagawa Prefecture
Railway stations in Japan opened in 1922
Railway stations in Odawara